Falcon 9 Block 5 is a partially reusable two-stage-to-orbit medium-lift launch vehicle designed and manufactured in the United States by SpaceX. It is the fifth version of Falcon 9 Full Thrust, powered by SpaceX Merlin engines burning rocket-grade kerosene (RP-1) and liquid oxygen (LOX). 

The main changes from Block 3 to Block 5 are higher-thrust engines and improvements to the landing legs. Numerous other small changes helped streamline recovery and re-usability of first-stage boosters, increase production rate, and optimize re-usability. Each Block 5 booster is designed to fly 10 times with only minor attention and up to 100 times with refurbishment.

In 2018, Falcon 9 Block 5 succeeded the transitional Block 4 version. The maiden flight launched the satellite Bangabandhu-1 on May 11, 2018. The CRS-15 mission on June 29, 2018 was the last Block 4 version of Falcon 9 to be launched. This was the transition to an all-Block 5 fleet.

Overview

The Block 5 design changes are principally driven by upgrades needed for NASA's Commercial Crew program and National Security Space Launch requirements. They include performance upgrades, manufacturing improvements, and "probably 100 or so changes" to increase the margin for demanding customers.

Block 5 includes an improved flight control system for an optimized angle of attack on the descent, lowering landing fuel requirements.

For reusability endurance:
 expected to be able to be launched at least 10 times; achieved in 2021
 up to 100 uses with refurbishment;
 a reusable heat shield protecting the engines and plumbing at the base of the rocket;
 more temperature-resistant cast and machined titanium grid fins;
 a thermal-protection coating on the first stage to limit reentry heating damage, including a black thermal protection layer on the landing legs, raceway, and interstage;
 redesigned and requalified more robust and longer life valves;
 redesigned composite overwrapped pressure vessels (COPV 2.0) for helium, to avoid oxygen freezing inside the structure of the tanks that lead to rupture.

For rapid reusability:
 reduced refurbishment between flights;
 a set of retractable landing legs for rapid recovery and shipping.
 the Octaweb structure is bolted together instead of welded, reducing manufacturing time.

Improvements 
Since the debut of Block 5, SpaceX has continued to iterate on its design, manufacturing processes, and operational procedures. Among other changes, the initial Block 5 boosters did not have the redesigned composite overwrapped pressure vessel (COPV2) tanks. The first booster with COPV2 tanks was booster B1047 on the Es'hail 2 mission on November 15, 2018, and the second booster using the COPV2 tanks was CRS-16/B1050, which had its first launch on December 5, 2018. To improve the rocket's performance, SpaceX has tweaked throttle settings and separation timings. Later Block 5 boosters are also easier to prepare for flight, so SpaceX "prefer to retire" older cores by assigning them to expendable missions when possible.

Human rating
The NASA certification processes of the 2010s specified seven flights of any launch vehicle without major design changes before the vehicle would be NASA-certified for human spaceflight, and allowed to fly NASA astronauts.

The Block 5 design launched astronauts for the first time on May 30, 2020, on a NASA-contracted flight labelled Crew Dragon Demo-2. This was the first crewed orbital spaceflight launched from the United States since the final Space Shuttle mission in 2011, and the first ever operated by a commercial provider.

See also

 Falcon 9 Full Thrust, has 1st & 2nd stage specifications
 Falcon Heavy, derivative launcher
 List of Falcon 9 and Falcon Heavy launches
 List of Falcon 9 Block 5 first-stage boosters
 Saturn IB, Apollo crewed LEO launcher (1966-1975)
 SpaceX Starship
 Falcon 9

References

External links
 Link to Falcon User's Guide, by SpaceX. Updated in January 2019 specifically for Block 5 upgrades.

SpaceX launch vehicles
Partially reusable space launch vehicles
Vehicles introduced in 2018
Falcon 9